Pig Destroyer / Coldworker / Antigama is a split EP by Pig Destroyer, Coldworker, and Antigama. The release is limited to 1000 copies, pressed on red vinyl.

Track listing

Side A
Pig Destroyer – "Abaraxas Annihilation" (Integrity cover) – 1:47
Pig Destroyer – "Understand" (Unsane cover) – 2:53

Side B
Coldworker – "Far Beyond Driven" – 2:40
Antigama – "Zoom" – 2:08

References

Pig Destroyer albums
Coldworker albums
Split EPs
2007 EPs
Relapse Records EPs